Sheikh Abdullah (1905–1982), was the 1st elected prime minister and 3rd chief minister of Jammu and Kashmir

Sheikh Abdullah may also refer to:

 Sheikh Abdullah (politician) (born 1965), Pakistani politician, former member of the Provincial Assembly of Sindh
 Sheikh Abdullah (educationalist) (1874–1965), Indian educationalist, social reformer, lawyer, founder of Women's College, Aligarh

Other uses 
 Sheikh Abdullah Al-Salem Cultural Centre, cultural complex located in Kuwait 

Indian masculine given names
Pakistani masculine given names